Hidden Treasures may refer to:

 Hidden Treasures (cereal), a short-lived breakfast cereal by General Mills
 Hidden Treasures (TV series), a TVB modern drama series

Music
 Hidden Treasures (EP), a 1995 EP by Megadeth
 Hidden Treasures (Kingston Trio album), re-released as Treasure Chest
 Hidden Treasures (Stroke 9 album), 2004
 Hidden Treasures, a trilogy of compilation albums by The Seekers
 Hidden Treasures – Volume 1 (2020)
 Hidden Treasures – Volume 2 (2020)
 Hidden Treasures, a 1993 album by Barry Manilow
 Hidden Treasures, a 2011 album by Dave Davies; see

See also
 Hidden Treasures of Taj Mahal, a compilation album by American blues artist Taj Mahal
 Hidden Treasure (disambiguation)